Ben Caballero is an American entrepreneur, real estate professional, founder and CEO of HomesUSA.com. He holds the record in the Guinness World Records for real estate sales. In 2015 Caballero became the first real estate professional to exceed USD $1 billion in home sales in a single year. In 2018 he became the first real estate professional to exceed $2 billion in home sales in a single year, a threshold he surpassed again in 2019 and 2020. Between 2004 and 2021, Caballero was the real estate agent of record for approximately 48,000 property sales and $17 billion in cumulative transaction volume.

Career
Caballero was ranked as the top individual U.S. real estate agent in 2022 for total transaction dollar volume and total number of real estate sales transactions by RealTrends as published in The Wall Street Journal. He has been ranked the top individual U.S. real estate agent in both categories every year since 2013.

Over the course of 2018, Caballero broke his own 2016 Guinness World Records title for “Most annual home sale transactions through MLS by an individual sell side real estate agent” as he sold 5,801 homes totaling $2.27 billion in volume. 

Two years later, in 2020, Caballero exceeded his 2018 record, earning him recognition from Guinness World Records for a third time. Over the course of 2020, he sold 6,438 homes totaling $2.46 billion in volume.

Caballero was named Most Innovative Real Estate Agent by Inman News in 2013, a finalist in 2016 and 2018, and an industry influencer in 2017.

Caballero became a real estate broker at the age of 21 and was a home builder for 18 years.

References

External links 
https://www.bencaballero.com
https://www.homesusa.com

American real estate brokers
American construction businesspeople

Year of birth missing (living people)
Living people